Darren E. Sherkat (born December 31, 1965) is an American sociologist and professor in the department of sociology at Southern Illinois University Carbondale (SIU Carbondale).

Education
Sherkat received his B.A. in sociology in 1987 from the University of Tulsa, and his M.A. and Ph.D. from Duke University in 1989 and 1991, respectively.

Career
In 1991, Sherkat joined the faculty of Vanderbilt University as an assistant professor of sociology. He became an associate professor there in 1996 and remained one until leaving Vanderbilt for SIU Carbondale in 2001, where he again became an associate professor of sociology. From 2002 to 2005, he was the director of graduate studies in SIU Carbondale's sociology department, and in 2004, he became a full professor there.

Research
In the field of sociology, Sherkat is known for studying religion-related topics, as well as those pertaining to family and politics. Specific topics pertaining to religion he has studies include the unaffiliated, the factors that lead to churches being either successful or unsuccessful, the popularity of classical music among Baby Boomers, and the role of religion in influence students' choice of which college to attend.

Personal life
Sherkat is an avowed atheist.

References

Living people
Sociologists of religion
1965 births
Southern Illinois University Carbondale faculty
University of Tulsa alumni
Duke University alumni
American sociologists
Vanderbilt University faculty
Place of birth missing (living people)